New Hampshire Route 47 (abbreviated NH 47) is a  state highway in southern New Hampshire, United States. It runs from Francestown to Bennington.  It is signed as a north–south route, but follows more of an east–west routing.  In fact, during its "northernmost" (westernmost) 2.4 miles, it proceeds southwest while signed north (and vice versa).

NH 47 essentially functions as a northern bypass of New Hampshire Route 31 and New Hampshire Route 136, which pass through (and intersect in) Greenfield.  Between this intersection and NH 47's endpoints, the three routes form a complete loop.

Route description
NH 47 begins at an intersection with NH 136 in Francestown. It proceeds generally northwest out of town and crosses into Bennington. The route reaches its northernmost point about two miles east of town, before turning southwest (while still signed northbound) for the remainder of its route. NH 47 ends at the intersection with NH 31 in the center of town.

Junction list

Road names

Route 47 uses the following local road names:

Bennington
Pierce Road
School Street
Francestown Road
Francestown
Bennington Road
Second New Hampshire Turnpike
Main Street

References

External links

 New Hampshire State Route 47 on Flickr

047
Transportation in Hillsborough County, New Hampshire